Angst Is Not a Weltanschauung is a solo studio album by B. Fleischmann. It was released on Morr Music on 14 November 2008.

Critical reception

Jennifer Kelly of PopMatters gave the album 6 stars out of 10, stating: "There are a handful of all-electronics cuts that showcase Fleischmann's skill with rhythm (he's trained as a drummer) and playful mood." Roque Strew of Pitchfork gave the album a 6.9 out of 10, writing: "All the way up to this most recent release, recorded in the wake of a friend's death, Fleischmann's subtly uplifting tunes have never lost the through-line of melancholy that winds back to his Morr Music debut, Pop Loops for Breakfast." He added, "Angst continues that upward curve of building complexity and nuance, owing no small debt to the chorus of new, colorful, delicate voices that, to take a phrase from his closing song, fill up Fleischmann's castles of memory." Ned Raggett of AllMusic gave the album 4 stars out of 5, commenting that "possibly one of his best qualities is simply how he uses his guest singers, especially Sweet William Van Ghost."

Track listing

Personnel
Credits adapted from liner notes.

 B. Fleischmann – vocals (5, 9), re-arrangement (6), performance, recording, mixing, mastering
 Sweet William Van Ghost – vocals (1, 2, 4)
 Marilies Jagsch – vocals (2, 4)
 Christian Dolezal – additional guitar (3, 4)
 Daniel Johnston – vocals (6)
 Christoph Kurzmann – re-arrangement (6)
 Christoph Amann – recording, mixing, mastering
 Jan Kruse – artwork

References

External links
 

2008 albums
Morr Music albums
Electronic albums by Austrian artists